Rufoclanis fulgurans is a moth of the family Sphingidae. It is known from dry savanna and bush from Zimbabwe to Tanzania and eastern Kenya.

The length of the forewings is 22–32 mm for males and about 40 mm for females. The forewings are pale pinkish brown with a well defined non-crenulate dark medial line, which runs more or less parallel to the termen. The basal, subbasal, postmedial and subterminal lines are wavy and much less clearly defined. There are two small dark dots at the base, sometimes merging into a single elongated dot. The hindwings are pink with two prominent dark reddish brown spots near the tornus. There is a dark median line on the vertex and dorsum of the thorax.

References

Rufoclanis
Moths described in 1903
Moths of Africa